Axiocerses harpax, the common scarlet, is a butterfly in the family Lycaenidae.

Range

It is found in Senegal, the Gambia, Guinea-Bissau, Guinea, Mali, Sierra Leone, Liberia, Ivory Coast, Burkina Faso, Ghana, Togo, Benin, Nigeria, Cameroon, Chad, the Central African Republic, the DRCongo, Sudan, Uganda, Ethiopia, Somalia, Yemen, Oman, Kenya and Tanzania. The habitat consists of forests, woodland and savanna.

Description
The length of the forewings is 15.5-17.2 mm for males and 14.5-18.5 mm for females.

Biology and food plants
The adults of both sexes are attracted to flowers. The larvae feed on Acacia drepanolobium and Acacia stenocarpa. They are associated with ants of the Crematogaster and Pheidole genera. They live under the bark of their host plant and are gregarious.

Subspecies
A. h. harpax – Senegal, the Gambia, Guinea-Bissau, Guinea, Mali, Sierra Leone, Liberia, Ivory Coast, Ghana, Togo, Benin, western Nigeria
A. h. efulena Clench, 1963 – southern Cameroon, DRCongo
A. h. kadugli Talbot, 1935 – Senegal, Mali, Chad, Sudan, Ethiopia, Somalia, Yemen, Oman: Dhofar
A. h. ugandana Clench, 1963 – south-eastern Central African Republic, north-eastern DRCongo, Uganda, western Kenya, north-western Tanzania

References

Butterflies described in 1775
Axiocerses
Taxa named by Johan Christian Fabricius